Frontier of Dreams was a New Zealand documentary television series. It covered the history of New Zealand from its geological past through to the present day in 13 one-hour episodes, and was broadcast by Television New Zealand from 24 September 2005 weekly until December. The series is the largest documentary ever made in New Zealand and took nearly five years to make.

A book with the same title was launched jointly with the TV series on 21 September 2005 at the Museum of New Zealand.

External links
TVNZ

2005 in New Zealand television
2005 New Zealand television series debuts
2005 New Zealand television series endings
New Zealand books
New Zealand documentary television series
TVNZ original programming
Television shows funded by NZ on Air
History of New Zealand